Henry M. Gallagher (September 10, 1885 – April 3, 1965) was an American jurist.

Biography
Born in Wilton Township, Waseca County, Minnesota, Gallagher graduated from Waseca High School. He then received his law degree from Creighton University, in 1910. Gallagher practiced law in Waseca, Minnesota, served as municipal judge and on the Waseca School Board. He also served as Waseca Count Attorney. He served as chief justice of the Minnesota Supreme Court from December 1938 to January 1944. Gallagher then practiced law in Mankato, Minnesota.

His brother was Frank T. Gallagher who also served on the Minnesota Supreme Court.  
 
He died in Waseca, Minnesota at his home from a series of strokes.

Notes

1885 births
1965 deaths
People from Waseca County, Minnesota
Creighton University alumni
School board members in Minnesota
Minnesota lawyers
Chief Justices of the Minnesota Supreme Court
Minnesota state court judges
20th-century American judges
20th-century American lawyers